Mishima, is an island in the Hagi Archipelago, in Yamaguchi Prefecture in the Chūgoku region of south-western Honshu, Japan.

Battle of Tsushima 

The Battle of Tsushima between Russian and Japanese forces took place near the island of Mishima on 27–28 May 1905, during the Russo-Japanese War. Nikolai Nebogatov surrendered to the Japanese on 28 May, and his remaining ships were taken. One of these, the Admiral Seniavin, was renamed Mishima when commissioned into the Imperial Japanese Navy.

Cattle 

The island is home to the rare and criticallyendangered Mishima breed of Japanese native cattle, which was declared a Japanese National Treasure in 1928, and is one of two remaining breeds of Japanese native cattle – the other being the Kuchinoshima breed on Kuchinoshima island in the Tokara Islands.

Clay 

The island is the source of Mishima clay, a dark red basaltic clay high in iron, with low plasticity, which was one of the three types of clay used to make Hagi ware.

References 

Islands of Yamaguchi Prefecture